BS7 may refer to :
 BS7, a BS postcode area for Bristol, England
 BS7, a center drill bit size
 Bežigrajska soseska 7 (residential blocks in Ljubljana, Slovenia)
 BS 7 Dimensions of Copper Conductors Insulated Annealed, for Electric Power and Light, a British Standard
Bonomi BS.7 Allievo Italia, a primary glider